Lakshminarayan is a manifestation of Vishnu in Hinduism.

Lakshminarayan or Lakshmi Narayan may also refer to:

 Lakshminarayan of Bhurishrestha, last ruler of the independent Hindu kingdom of Bhurishrestha
 Laxminarayana Mudiraj, Indian politician
 Rambhatla Lakshminarayana Sastry, an eminent Indian teacher and author
 Lakshmi Narayan Sharma, Hindi guru and exponent of Bhakti yoga
 Laxmi Narayan Tripathi, Indian LGBT activist
 Appadvedula Lakshmi Narayan (1887–1973), Indian astrophysicist
 V. V. Lakshminarayana, Additional Director General of Police in Mumbai
 P. Lakshmi Narayana, Indian actor
 Sattiraju Lakshmi Narayana, Indian film director

Other uses
 Laxmi Narayan (film), a 1951 Hindi film

See also
Laxmi Narayan Mandir (disambiguation)

Masculine given names